Hurricane Henri was a rare tropical cyclone that entered the Gulf of Mexico without having made landfall; it was the second of four times this occurred during the 20th century. The eighth named storm and fifth hurricane of the 1979 Atlantic hurricane season, it formed on September 14 in the northwestern Caribbean Sea. Throughout much of its duration, Henri moved erratically and initially maintained a general westward track. On September 16 it attained tropical storm status, and a day later it reached hurricane status. By two days later, after experiencing hostile conditions, Henri weakened to tropical depression status as it turned to the northeast, before degenerating into a remnant low on September 21. On September 24, it merged with a frontal low in the northeast Gulf of Mexico. Due to its slow and erratic motion, the hurricane forced evacuations along the Mexican coastline. Its remnants brought rainfall and flooding to the Florida Panhandle.

Meteorological history

Hurricane Henri developed as Tropical Depression Eighteen in the extreme northwestern Caribbean Sea on September 14 from a tropical wave, which had previously moved off the coast of Africa. The formation of a tropical depression was confirmed by reports from Hurricane Hunters. The depression tracked northward, brushing the eastern portion of the Yucatán Peninsula. After reaching the Gulf of Mexico it turned sharply westward, with a ridge preventing further northward movement. The depression turned southwestward, and intensified into Tropical Storm Henri on September 16.

Tropical Storm Henri continued to intensify as it tracked through the Bay of Campeche. On September 17, the storm turned northwestward after the ridge to its north weakened, and later that day Henri reached hurricane status; six hours later, it reached peak winds of 85 mph (140 km/h) about 150 miles (245 km) northeast of Veracruz. Subsequently, a broad low pressure area developed over the western Gulf of Mexico, causing the motion of Henri to become erratic. On September 18, the cyclone began a steady weakening trend, believed to have been caused by land interaction and the funneling of moisture toward a developing disturbance near the Texas coast. Henri turned eastward on September 19 and weakened to tropical depression status. It failed to regain significant convection, and it turned northeastward along an extended cold front. On September 21, Henri weakened into a remnant low. On September 24, Henri merged with the frontal trough in the northeastern Gulf of Mexico.

Hurricane Henri was one of only four hurricanes to enter the Gulf of Mexico without making landfall during the 20th century. The others were Laurie of 1969, Jeanne of 1980, and Alberto of 1982.

Preparations and impact 

Although Henri did not affect land in any way as a hurricane, the developing system threatened several states along the southwestern coastline in Mexico. Mexican forecasting officials issued an advisory for the Gulf coast towns of Tampico in Tamaulipas, and Tuxpan and Nautla in Veracruz, to evacuate to higher ground. The government of Veracruz issued warnings on radio and television of possible flooding in oil-rich coastlines. The storm affected cleanup operations of the Ixtoc I oil spill as it passed over the spill area, damaging a 310-ton steel cap designed to stop the blowout. Henri caused driving rains, strong winds, and floods in Ciudad del Carmen, Campeche, forcing over 2000 people from their homes. Waters swelled in the town to about 12 inches (305 mm) above sea level.

The remnants of Henri brought showers and thunderstorms to west-central Florida, causing river flooding and some evacuations.

See also

 Other tropical cyclones named Henri
 List of Category 1 Atlantic hurricanes
 Hurricane Ingrid (2013)

References

External links
National Hurricane Center Preliminary Storm Report on Henri
Details on all 1979 storms from the National Hurricane Center

1979 Atlantic hurricane season
Category 1 Atlantic hurricanes
Atlantic hurricanes in Mexico
1979 in Mexico
Hurricanes in Florida